I  Need Dubs is the first single from Master P's 2005 studio album, Ghetto Bill, produced by him. The song features his son Romeo Miller. The song samples LL Cool J's I Need Love.

Chart awards

References

2005 singles
Master P songs
Romeo Miller songs
2004 songs
Songs written by LL Cool J
Songs written by Dwayne Simon
Songs written by DJ Bobcat
MNRK Music Group singles